Mizuki Yamada (12 September 1928 – 10 December 2008) was a Japanese sailor. He competed in the Star event at the 1960 Summer Olympics.

References

External links
 

1928 births
2008 deaths
Japanese male sailors (sport)
Olympic sailors of Japan
Sailors at the 1960 Summer Olympics – Star
Sportspeople from Hokkaido